"My Love Is the Shhh!" is a song co-written, produced and performed by American contemporary R&B group Somethin' for the People, issued as the lead single from their second studio album This Time It's Personal. It features vocals from fellow contemporary R&B group Trina & Tamara. The song samples "It's Been a Long Time" by The New Birth; and it was the group's only hit on the Billboard Hot 100, peaking at #4 in 1997. It also reached #1 on the Billboard Rhythmic Top 40 chart.

The single was certified platinum by the RIAA on December 17, 1997.

Music video

The official music video for the song was directed by Rashidi Natara Harper.

Chart positions

Weekly charts

Year-end charts

References

External links
 
 

1997 songs
1997 singles
Somethin' for the People songs
Warner Records singles